is a Japanese web manga series written and illustrated by Nejiganameta. It was serialized on Shogakukan's online platforms MangaONE and Ura Sunday from May 2020 to April 2022, with its chapters collected in six tankōbon volumes.

Publication
Written and illustrated by Nejiganameta, Ladies on Top was serialized on Shogakukan's online platform  from May 21, 2020, to April 28, 2022. it was also published on  starting on May 28, 2020. Shogakukan collected its chapters in six tankōbon volumes, released from September 11, 2020, to August 19, 2022.

In January 2022, Seven Seas Entertainment announced that they had licensed the series and that it would be released under their new imprint, Steamship, for series that would be considered "sexy romance for women." The first volume was released on September 13, 2022.

Volume list

Notes

References

Further reading

External links
  
 

Japanese webcomics
Josei manga
Romantic comedy anime and manga
Seven Seas Entertainment titles
Sex comedy anime and manga
Shogakukan manga
Webcomics in print